Henry Holmes (February 1703 – 11 August 1762) was a British army officer, Lieutenant-Governor of the Isle of Wight (1754–62), and Member of Parliament (MP) for Newtown (1741–47) and Yarmouth (1747–62).

Military career 
The second son of Henry Holmes, a Member of Parliament and Lieutenant-Governor of the Isle of Wight, Holmes was commissioned as an ensign in the 28th Foot in 1721. He was promoted to lieutenant in 1723, captain in 1727, major in 1740, lieutenant colonel in 1743. It was in 1746 that he is said to have won the favour of the King. A military expedition was being planned, and it was widely believed that its destination was to be Canada. The King questioning the officers when they would be ready to embark, several of them asked for a few weeks leave of absence; but when the King turned to Holmes, he replied "Tomorrow, and whenever your Majesty should require my service." He was immediately promoted to Colonel in charge of a regiment of marines, and duly served in the planned action, although it turned out that it was only to be an assault on the coast of Brittany.

Holmes remained a favourite of George II. In 1749, he was appointed colonel of the 31st Foot, nicknamed the "Young Buffs". He was further promoted to major general in 1756 and lieutenant general in 1759.

Political career 
Holmes's older brother Thomas Holmes was the government's election manager on the Isle of Wight, eventually rewarded with an Irish peerage for his services and being allowed almost complete control over the nomination of MPs for five of the island's six Parliamentary seats. In 1741, Henry was elected at Thomas's instigation for Newtown; after one Parliament, he transferred to Yarmouth, which he represented for the rest of his life. He was also appointed Lieutenant-Governor of the Isle of Wight, in 1754. He died in 1762.

Family 
He had married Anne, the daughter of Nicholas Lysaght of Mountnorth, co. Cork, but had no children. Holmes's younger brother, Charles Holmes, was also an Isle of Wight MP and a distinguished naval leader, third in command during Wolfe's capture of Quebec.

Genealogy

 Henry Holmes of Mallow, Cork, Ireland
 Colonel Thomas Holmes of Kilmallock, Limerick, Ireland
 Henry Holmes (–1738) m. Mary Holmes (daughter of Admiral Sir Robert Holmes)
  Thomas Holmes, 1st Baron Holmes (1699–1764)
 Lieutenant General Henry Holmes (1703–62)
 Rear Admiral Charles Holmes (1711–1761)
 Elizabeth Holmes m. Thomas Troughear
 Leonard (Troughear) Holmes, 1st Baron Holmes (–1804) m. Elizabeth Tyrrell (d.1810)
 The Hon. Elizabeth Holmes m. Edward Rushout
 Descendants
 Admiral Sir Robert Holmes (–1692), English Admiral
 Mary Holmes (wife of Henry Holmes)
 Admiral Sir John Holmes (1640?–1683), English Admiral leader

References

 Lewis Namier & John Brooke, The History of Parliament: The House of Commons 1754-1790 (London: HMSO, 1964)
 
 Holmes à Court Family History

 

1703 births
1762 deaths
Members of Parliament for the Isle of Wight
British MPs 1741–1747
British MPs 1747–1754
British Army lieutenant generals
28th Regiment of Foot officers